Azhar Abbas Haraj, was born 1 April 1975 in Roshan Pur, Khanewal, Pakistan. He is a Pakistan cricketer who played for the Auckland Aces and Wellington Firebirds in State Championship. He is a NZC Level 3 Cricket Coach. He was Bowling Coach for Auckland Aces 2015–17. He is a Director of Coaching at Eden Roskill District Cricket Club. He is also a Founder of NZ Pace Academy.

See also
 List of Auckland representative cricketers

References

External links
 

1975 births
Living people
Pakistani cricketers
Zarai Taraqiati Bank Limited cricketers
Auckland cricketers
Cricketers from Khanewal
Multan cricketers
Pakistan Railways cricketers
Pakistani expatriates in New Zealand
Sui Northern Gas Pipelines Limited cricketers
Wellington cricketers
Bahawalpur cricketers